Bythaelurus vivaldii, Vivaldi's catshark, is a species of catshark found in Northwestern Indian Ocean, specifically in Somalia.

This small deep-water catshark has a long and broad head, a stout body, a shorter caudal fin, a larger interdorsal space, and a larger intergill length compared to all congeners living in Western Indian Ocean.

References 

vivaldi
Fish described in 2017